Uzun is an urban-type settlement in Surxondaryo Region, Uzbekistan. It is the administrative center of Uzun District. Its population was 11,620 people in 1989, and 14,600 in 2016.

References

Populated places in Surxondaryo Region
Urban-type settlements in Uzbekistan